Speed FX Racing (sometimes known as Ford Rising Stars Racing) is an Australian motor racing team. The team presently runs in the historic series Touring Car Masters with Michael Wedge driving their Holden HQ Monaro.

The team is best known as a former V8 Supercar racing team that debuted in the V8 Supercar main series in 2008 after four seasons in the lower tier Fujitsu series. The team was based prepared in Melbourne, as a satellite operate of Ford Performance Racing. The team has finished fourth and second in the second tier Fujitsu Series with Michael Caruso driving and have previously run a Fujitsu series car for Warren Luff with assistance from Stone Brothers Racing.

Because of the lateness of the deal securing a former Paul Weel Racing franchise to run in the 2008 season, the team have received special dispensation to skip the two opening rounds of the season and will make their debut in the series at the non-championship event at Albert Park, Melbourne on the support program for the Australian Grand Prix.

Michael Patrizi drove the car during the team's one season operating in the V8 Supercar Championship Series and after a disappointing 2008 the team folded, the team's Racing Entitlement Contract passing to Team IntaRacing.

The team resurfaced in Touring Car Masters where they were the first to build a Ford XB Falcon Hardtop for the series after the series expanded its vehicle eligibility in 2011. Two-time Australian Touring Car Champion Glenn Seton joined the team as a driver. In 2012 the car was sold and the team are now working with Queensland driver Michael Wedge to run a Holden HQ Monaro driven in 2011 by Jason Richards.

References

External links
The Ford Rising Stars Racing Team website
The V8 Supercar website

2008 establishments in Australia
Supercars Championship teams
Australian auto racing teams
Sports teams in Victoria (Australia)
Auto racing teams established in 2008